Callia tristis is a species of beetle in the family Cerambycidae. It was described by Galileo and Martins in 2002. It is known from Bolivia.

References

Calliini
Beetles described in 2002